Robert Glendinning (born 6 October 1995) is an Australian professional baseball third baseman for the Kansas City Royals organization.

Career
Glendinning is from Scarborough, Western Australia. He enrolled at North Iowa Area Community College and played college baseball there for two seasons. He transferred to the University of Missouri and continued his college baseball career with the Missouri Tigers. In 2016, he played collegiate summer baseball with the Wareham Gatemen of the Cape Cod Baseball League.

The Pittsburgh Pirates selected Glendinning in the 21st round, with the 628th overall selection, of the 2017 Major League Baseball draft. He did not play in the United States in 2020 after the season was cancelled due to the COVID-19 pandemic, but played for the Perth Heat in the 2020–21 Australian Baseball League season. Glendinning became a free agent after the 2021 season, and he signed with the Kansas City Royals.

Glendinning played for the Australian national baseball team in the 2023 World Baseball Classic.

Personal life
Glendinning's brother, Cameron, played college baseball for the University of New Orleans.

References

External links

Living people
Wareham Gatemen players
1996 births
Australian expatriate baseball players in the United States
Sportspeople from Perth, Western Australia
Missouri Tigers baseball players
Perth Heat players
West Virginia Black Bears players
West Virginia Power players
Altoona Curve players
Bradenton Marauders players
Northwest Arkansas Naturals players
Melbourne Aces players
2023 World Baseball Classic players